Robert and Bertram (Polish: Robert i Bertrand) is a 1938 Polish comedy film directed by Mieczysław Krawicz and starring Helena Grossówna, Eugeniusz Bodo and Adolf Dymsza. It was inspired by a comedy sketch by Johann Nestroy which was in turn based on an 1856 farce Robert and Bertram by the German writer Gustav Räder featuring two wandering vagrants with hearts of gold. A German adaptation was made the following year. The film's art direction was by Jacek Rotmil and Stefan Norris.

Cast
 Helena Grossówna - Irena
 Eugeniusz Bodo - Bertrand
 Adolf Dymsza - Robert
 Mieczysława Ćwiklińska - siostra Ippla
 Antoni Fertner - Ippel, ojciec Ireny
 Michał Znicz - baron Dobkiewicz
 Józef Orwid - dozorca więzienia
 Julian Krzewiński - lokaj
 Feliks Żukowski - pan młody
 Henryk Małkowski
 Edmund Minowicz
 Wincenty Łoskot

References

External links

1938 films
Polish comedy films
1930s Polish-language films
Films directed by Mieczysław Krawicz
Polish films based on plays
1938 comedy films
Polish black-and-white films